Anastasiya Yuriyivna Spas (born  6 August 1993) is a Ukrainian modern pentathlete. She has qualified for the 2016 Summer Olympics.

References

External links 
 

1993 births
Living people
Ukrainian female modern pentathletes
Modern pentathletes at the 2016 Summer Olympics
Olympic modern pentathletes of Ukraine
Modern pentathletes at the 2010 Summer Youth Olympics